|-
| Arado E.381 Kleinstjäger || Germany || Air launch || Fighter || 1944 || Project || 0 || Carried by an Arado Ar 234.
|-
| Avro 720 || UK || CTOL ||  || 1956 || Project || 0 || Mixed power.
|-
| Bachem Ba 349 "Natter" || Germany || VTOL || Fighter || 1945 || Production || 36 || Point defence interceptor. Never saw action (debatable footage, seems to show a Ba 349 in combat. ).
|-
| Bell X-1 || USA || Air launch || Research || 1947 || Prototype || 7 || First aircraft to break the sound barrier in level flight.
|-
| Bell X-2 || USA || Air launch || Research || 1955 || Prototype || 2 || Supersonic.
|-
| Bereznyak-Isayev BI-1 || USSR || CTOL || Fighter || 1942 ||  || 9 || 
|-
| Bisnovat 5 || USSR || CTOL ||  || 1948 || Project ||  || Based on captured DFS 346. Never flew under power.
|-
| Cattaneo Magni RR || Italy || CTOL || Research || 1931 || Prototype ||  || 
|-
| Cheranovsky RP-1 || USSR|| CTOL || Research || 1932 || Prototype ||  || Test in 1933 ended in engine failure.
|-
| DFS 194 || Germany || CTOL || Experimental || 1940 || Operational || 1 || Tailless, direct predecessor of Me 163 series.
|-
| Douglas D-588-II Skyrocket || USA || Air launch || Research || 1953 || Operational || 3 || Supersonic.
|-
| EZ-Rocket || USA || CTOL || Experimental || 2001 || Prototype || 1 || Rocket-powered variant of Rutan Long-EZ.
|-
| Focke-Wulf Volksjäger || Germany || CTOL || Fighter || 1944 || Project || 0 || Three rocket-powered variants under construction at the end of hostilities.
|-
| Hawker P.1072 || UK || CTOL ||  || 1949 || Prototype || 1 || Mixed power.
|-
| Heinkel He 112R || Germany || CTOL || Experimental || 1937 || Operational || 1 || Rocket and piston engines.
|-
| Heinkel He 176 || Germany || CTOL || Research || 1939 || Prototype || 1 || Pioneering liquid-fueled rocket propulsion aircraft. 
|-
|  He P.1077 Julia || Germany || CTOL || Fighter || 1944 || Project || 0 ||
|-
|  Ju EF.127 Walli || Germany || CTOL || Fighter || 1944 || Project || 0 || 
|-
| Korolyov RP-318 || USSR || CTOL || Research || 1940 ||  || 1 || 
|-
| Lavochkin La-7R || USSR || CTOL ||  || 1945 ||  || 1 || Rocket and piston engines.
|-
| Lippisch Ente || Germany || CTOL || Research || 1928 || Prototype Opel-RAK program || 1 || First rocket-powered aircraft, part of Opel-RAK program.
|-
| Lockheed NF-104A || USA || CTOL || Trainer || 1963 ||  || 3 || Rocket and jet engines.
|-
| Martin Marietta X-24A || USA || Air launch || Research || 1969 || Prototype || 1 || Lifting body.
|-
| Martin Marietta X-24B || USA || Air launch || Research || 1973 || Prototype || 1 || Lifting body.
|-
| Messerschmitt Me 163 || Germany || CTOL || Fighter || 1941 ||Production || 10 A-subtype~360 B-subtype || Tailless, B-version saw combat May 1944-May 1945.
|-
| Messerschmitt Me 263 || Germany || CTOL || Fighter || 1944 ||  || 3 || Also known as Ju 248, development of Me 163.
|-
| Messerschmitt P.1104 || Germany || Air launch || Fighter || 1944 || Project || 0 || 
|-
| Mitsubishi J8M || Japan || CTOL || Fighter || 1945 ||  || 7 || Was to have been a licensed Messerschmitt Me 163 but the plans were lost so was only similar.
|-
|  Mizuno Shinryu II || Japan || CTOL ||  || 1945 || Project || 0 || Second aircraft developed in Japan to use a canard design after the J7W1.
|-
| North American X-15 || USA || Air launch || Research || 1959 || Operational || 3 || Hypersonic. Later variants capable of sub-orbital space flight.
|-
| Northrop XP-79 || USA || CTOL || Fighter || 1944 || Prototype || 1 || Flying wing. Converted to jet power for first and only flight.
|-
| Opel RAK.1 || Germany || CTOL || Research || 1929 || Operational || 1 || First purpose-built rocket-powered aircraft, Opel-RAK program.
|-
| Republic XF-91 Thunderceptor || USA || CTOL  ||  || 1949 ||  || 2 || Rocket and jet engines.
|-
| Rikugun Ki-202 || Japan || CTOL || Fighter || 1945 ||  || 0 || Improved J8M/Ki-200 with the elongated fuselage.
|-
| RRL Mark-III X-racer || USA || CTOL || Racer || 2010 ||  || 1 || 
|-
|  RRL Mark I X-racer || USA || CTOL || Racer || 2006 ||  || 1 || Customized Velocity SE, prototype for Rocket Racing League.
|-
| Saunders-Roe SR.53 || UK || CTOL || Fighter || 1957 || Prototype || 2 || Jet and rocket power.
|-
| Saunders-Roe SR.177 || UK || CTOL  || Fighter || 1958 || Project || 0 || Jet and rocket power. Development of SR.53.
|-
| SNCASO Trident || France || CTOL  || Experimental || 1953 || Prototype || 8 || Jet and rocket power.
|-
| SNCASE SE.212 Durandal || France || CTOL  || Fighter || 1956 || Prototype || 2 || Mixed power.
|-
| Sombold So 344 || Germany || Air launch ||  || 1944 || Project || 0 ||  bomber box buster with a detachable explosive nose.
|-
|  Sukhoi Su-7 || USSR || CTOL  ||  || 1944 ||  || 1 || Sukhoi Su-6 with rocket and piston engines.
|-
| Yakovlev Yak-3RD || USSR || CTOL ||  || 1945 || Prototype || 1 || Modified Yakovlev Yak-3 with rocket and piston engines.
|-
| Yokosuka MXY7 Ohka || Japan || Air launch || Attack || 1945 || Production ||  || Kamikaze aircraft.
|-
| Zeppelin Fliegende Panzerfaust || Germany || Air launch ||  || 1944 || Project || 0 || Towed behind a Messerschmitt Me 109G.
|-
| Zeppelin Rammer || Germany || Air launch || Fighter || 1944 || Project || 0 || Designed to use the aerial ramming technique against Allied bombers.
|}

See also

Zero-length launch
JATO
CAM ship

References

Lists of aircraft by power source